A speckled hen is a chicken of specked plumage. 

Speckled hen or Speckled Hen may refer to:

Old Speckled Hen, an English ale
Problem of the speckled hen, a problem in the theory of empirical knowledge
Pet speckled hen, or Guineafowl, an African bird
"", an East Slavic nursery rhyme
"Speckled Hen", an episode of Russian TV series Muhtar's Return